Monica's Gang or Monica and Friends (Portuguese: Turma da Mônica; British English: Monica & Friends) is a Brazilian comic book series and media franchise created by Mauricio de Sousa.

The series originated in a newspaper comic strip, named in the epoch as Blu, in which the protagonists were Blu (Bidu) and Franklin (Franjinha), launched by the newspaper Folha da Manhã in 1959. As the series continued, the central characters became Jimmy Five (Cebolinha) and Monica (Mônica), both of whom began to appear in eponymous series in addition to the renamed Monica’s Gang (Turma da Mônica). The English title of the series was later changed to Monica and Friends. The characters and comics were subsequently adapted into, among other media, an animated television series; as well as films, most of which are anthologies.

The stories revolve around the adventures of Monica and her friends in the fictional Lemon Tree Street (Rua do Limoeiro), inspired by the neighborhood of Cambuí in Campinas and the city of Mogi das Cruzes, where de Sousa spent his childhood. The Monica and Friends umbrella title also encompasses Chuck Billy 'n' Folks, Tina's Pals, Lionel's Kingdom and Bug-a-Booo, among other series.

Monica and Friends was previously published by Abril and Globo and has been published by Panini Comics since 2007. In 2008, a spin-off series, Monica Teen, was created in a manga style and features the characters as teenagers.

Publication history 
Maurício de Sousa, then-reporter for Folha da Manhã, in 1959, decided to enter the field of comics hitherto disputed in the country. In the same year made his first characters Blu and Franklin, and decided that Blu would be the protagonist. Both were based on his own childhood, Franklin based on Maurício himself and Blu on his pet dog Cuíca. The main inspirations of Monica and Friends were through American comics like Peanuts and Little Lulu, which have inspired some recurring themes like the boys' club. In the following year of 1960, the characters gained ground through the children's magazine Zaz Traz by publisher Editora Outubro, later getting their own comic titled Bidu by Editora Continental. However, the magazines were canceled that same year.

After that the characters returned to newspaper strips, the character Jimmy Five which had won great popularity in the previous magazines has become protagonist of their own strips of newspaper next to Blu and Franklin in 1961. Seeing potential in the character, Mauricio went on to create several supporting characters to appear in the Jimmy Five strips, like Smudge and Specs. But after so long Maurício received a complaint for the lack of feminine characters in his comics. So to avoid further controversy, in 1963 Monica was created, initially as a supporting character in the Jimmy Five strips (at first as the Specs' little sister) based on Mauricio's real daughter Mônica Sousa. Over time, the success and the charisma of the character made her be the protagonist of the series alongside Jimmy Five which became her sidekick. Also in 1963, Mauricio began to create new projects of comic strips with other characters without links with Monica and Jimmy Five, like Zezinho and Hiroshi (now called Chuck Billy 'n' Folks), The Cavern Clan, Bug-a-Booo, The Tribe and Raposão (now called Lionel's Kingdom).

The characters only returned to be published in a monthly comic book from 1970, by publisher Abril, initially under the title of "Mônica e Sua Turma" (Monica and Her Gang), later being changed to "Mônica" and "Turma da Mônica" (Monica's Gang), the latter title used only for merchandising. With so many of the characters ever created by Mauricio in strips of newspaper also began to appear in the comics of Monica's Gang. At that time the area of comics was more competitive in Brazil, many Brazilian artists were trying to hold his own in the stalls along the publications of American comics like Donald Duck, José Carioca, Little Lulu, and many others. Even with these new comics, Monica's Gang remained with their good sales on newsstands and with this soon came to the Jimmy Five's solo comic book three years later. Sales were great and with that a contract with the footballer Pelé was made for the launch of a character based on him, the Pelezinho, which was a phenomenon among children at the time, marking time in the history of Brazilian comics. Pelezinho was one of the few black characters made by Maurício, and his design wasn't the most flattering to the black community, with a pale colored circle around the character's mouth to represent his lips, a concept made infamous by the black face depiction of African people. In late 2013, however, Pelezinho's design was updated to reflect more modern sensibilities.

The staff of cartoonists has grown, leading to the foundation of the Estúdios Maurício de Sousa, that produce comics with the characters created by Mauricio de Sousa, and other marketing projects and cartoons of the characters. The first attempts to make a Monica and Friends cartoon occurred in the late 60s during a deal with Cica food company that produced some commercials for television, these being commercial who originated the character Thunder, who is currently a main character of the Lionel's Kingdom stories. The first film was only released in 1982, As Aventuras da Turma da Mônica which was produced in partnership with Black & White & Color and distributed by Embrafilme.

Over the years, other characters  gained  their own comic books, like Smudge (1982), Chuck Billy (1982) and Maggy (1989). Other media have strengthened over the years and Monica-branded merchandise were launched, with products like books, toys, discs, CD-ROM and video games. A Monica-themed amusement park was created in 1993 in São Paulo, titled "Parque da Mônica" (Monica Park). In 2008 the franchise has received a manga-style comic entitled Monica Teen.

Nowadays the comics are sold in 40 countries in 14 languages.

Characters 

The Monica and Friends series has an extensive amount of main and secondary characters. It has as main protagonists Monica, Jimmy Five, Smudge and Maggy and each has its own comic book. Other characters from other series created by Mauricio de Sousa are also included on Monica and Friends, making crossovers or quotations from each other in several stories, among several other characters. The main setting of the stories is the fictional Lemon Tree Street (Rua do Limoeiro).

Most stories focus on the daily lives of the main characters and occasionally on the secondary characters; the humour usually uses various types of repetitions, allusions, appeals to the nonsense, paranomasias, sarcasm and metalanguage. The stories with Monica and Jimmy Five revolve around the conflict between the two. Jimmy Five is a troublemaker and bully who always tries to scold Monica or steal her stuffed bunny to give knots in its ears (usually having Smudge or another boy accomplice), always having Monica get her revenge by hitting him with her stuffed bunny, often leaving him bruised and with black eyes. Often Jimmy Five makes plans against her with various traps, sometimes using Franklin's inventions or talking Smudge into helping, but he always loses to Monica at the end.

Smudge's stories often focus on his penchant for dirt and mess and his fear of water, having never bathed in his life, and constantly being threatened by villains or his friends to take a shower, with him always succeeding in not getting wet and staying dirty. The stories with Maggy generally focus on her gluttony, with a superhuman ability to eat more than a normal person without ever getting fat and sometimes stealing food from her friends.

Among the villains are Captain Fray, a supervillain with the power to control garbage and dirt, and Lord Raider, a space rabbit whose first appearance was in the movies. A joke often breaks the fourth wall.

Related works 
Other related works which relate to the series are:
 Blu - Based on the first character of Monica and Friends, it shows the character Blu, a sentient blue dog of the Schnauzer breed, as acting as a mere actor in a studio of comics.
 Chuck Billy 'n' Folks - Focuses on the comic daily life of Chuck Billy, a lazy farmer boy and his friends who live on a farm in Brazil's countryside. He's the one that most often appears in contact with Monica and Friends. The character have his own spin-off comic book series. As Monica and Friends, he received a spin-off manga-style comic in 2013 called Chico Bento Moço (Chuck Billy Young Man).
 Bug-a-Booo - Focuses on comedy stories involving monsters of horror films (ghosts, vampires, werewolfs, Frankenstein and even the death) in a cemetery.
 Tina's Pals - Shows a daily routine of a group of college students and their daily lives as they date, go to college, among other issues. In 2014, it received its own spin-off comic book series.
 The Funnies - Focuses on the comic adventures of Bubbly, an astronaut, as he explores space.
 Lionel's Kingdom - Focuses on the daily lives of a group of anthropomorphic animals of different species in a forest led by a lion king.
 The Cavern Clan - Focuses on Pitheco, a caveman inventor who is living in the midst of pre-history and tries to revolutionize humanity with his inventions.
 Horacio's World - Focuses on the life of a young philosopher, the dinosaur Horacio, and his friends.
 The Tribe - Focuses on an Amazonian native, Tom-Tom, who lives in a tropical forest constantly threatened by white men.

Media

Publications 

Monica and Friends and its related works are released in a number of different books. Firstly, they were published by Editora Abril, from 1970 to 1986, then Editora Globo, from 1987 to 2006. From 2007 on, Panini Comics was chosen to keep the publications. So far there are comic books starring many characters, among the best known and sold are the characters of Monica, Jimmy Five, Smudge, Maggy and Chuck Billy, plus almanacs with republication of classic stories with varying characters. In 2015 was released an app for smartphones gathering more than 500 editions of comics franchise for download.

Television and film adaptations 

The characters of Monica and Friends are also the protagonists of which can be considered the first Brazilian animation series. After being introduced on television as advertising-boys in TV advertisements from the mid-1960s, complete stories began to be produced in 1976 and distributed through film-compilations during the 1980s and 1990s (initially released in movies in cinema in the 1980s and then directly to video in the 1990s).

In 1999, a series of shorts with the characters was produced to the children's programming of Rede Globo (which would display these episodes only between the years 2010 and 2014). A regular broadcast of the series on TV only occurred in 2004 after negotiations with the Cartoon Network that since this year began broadcasting new episodes exclusively on the channel, still remaining on the schedule together of sister channels Tooncast (currently transmitted in Cartoon Cartoons block) and Boomerang.

In addition to the animations, the characters also starred in two animated feature films who presents bigger stories instead of short compilations; these are: "A Princesa e o Robô" (1983) and "Uma Aventura no Tempo" (2007) - as well as two TV and video specials in live-action: "Mônica e Cebolinha: No Mundo de Romeu e Julieta" (1979) and "A Rádio do Chico Bento" (1989).

Compilations 
 As Aventuras da Turma da Mônica (1982)
 As Novas Aventuras da Turma da Mônica (1986)
 Mônica e a Sereia do Rio (1987)
 O Bicho-Papão (1987)
 A Estrelinha Mágica (1988, direct-to-video)
 Chico Bento, Óia a Onça! (1990, direct-to-video)
 O Natal de Todos Nós (1992, direct-to-video)
 Quadro a Quadro (1996, direct-to-video)
 Videogibi: O Mônico (1997, direct-to-video)
 Videogibi: O Plano Sangrento (1998, direct-to-video)
 Videogibi: O Estranho Soro do Dr. X (1998, direct-to-video)
 Videogibi: A Ilha Misteriosa (1999, direct-to-video)
 Coleção Grandes Aventuras da Turma da Mônica (2002, recovery direct-to-video including new episodes)
 Cine Gibi: O Filme (2004)
 Cine Gibi 2 (2005, direct-to-video)
 Cine Gibi 3: Planos Infalíveis (2008, direct-to-video)
 Cine Gibi 4: Meninos e Meninas (2009, direct-to-video)
 Cine Gibi 5: Luzes, Câmera, Ação! (2010, direct-to-video)
 Se Liga na Turma da Mônica - Volume 1 (2011, direct-to-video)
 Se Liga na Turma da Mônica - Volume 2 (2012, direct-to-video)
 Cine Gibi 6 - Hora do Banho (2013, direct-to-video)
 Cine Gibi 7 - Bagunça Animal (2014, direct-to-video)
 Cine Gibi 8 - Tá Brincando? (2015, direct-to-video)
 Cine Gibi 9 - Vamos Fazer de Conta! (2016, direct-to-video)

Monica Toy 
Series launched to promote "Monica Toy" line launched by Tok & Stok, which features an ultra-stylized version of the characters of Monica in traits that refer to Toy Arts and famous franchises like Hello Kitty, Pucca and Gogo's Crazy Bones. There are currently 9 seasons, with mini-episodes each with about 30 seconds long, with 2D animation and exclusive language for web delivery.

From the episode "Hiccups" (released on July 17, 2013), the series was renamed and had its shortened to just "Monica Toy" title. On October 7, 2013, the series premiered on Cartoon Network in the interprograma format, debuting two episodes a week and airing at various times.

Turma da Mônica: Laços 
In 2019, in cooperation with Paris Filmes, Globo Filmes and Paramount Pictures, Mauricio de Sousa Produções released in Brazilian cinemas the movie Turma da Mônica: Laços, on June 27, being directed by Daniel Rezende. The movie was based on the best-selling eponymous graphic novel, written and drawn by siblings Victor Cafaggi and Lu Cafaggi. This was the first Monica and Friends live-action movie in which the main characters are played by real-life children, since the previous live-action movies were presented in the form of theater performances using adults in articulated mascots costumes.

The plot of the movie revolves around the relationship of the friends. When Jimmy Five's dog, Fluffy, is abruptly abducted, the children must unite and eventually overcome their differences while facing new adventures on the way so they can bring their loyal friend back home.

The movie presents Giulia Benite as Monica, Kevin Vechiatto as Jimmy Five, Laura Rauseo as Maggy and Gabriel Moreira as Smudge. It has been overly praised by Brazilian critics, who praises the balance between cartoonish situations with human conflicts. The movie represented one of the highest Brazilian box office of 2019.

Video games

In the 1990s, three Monica video games were released by Tectoy for the Master System and Mega Drive), all of them are reworked versions of Wonder Boy games, with translated text and sprites replaced with characters from the comic.

In the 1990s, MSP released three CD-ROMs with short stories complemented by minigames: Mônica Dentuça (1995), Cebolinha e Floquinho (1996) and A Roça do Chico Bento (1998). Two CDs for creating comic books with both Monica and Chuck Billy were also released.

In September 2010, Tec Toy announced that they would produce an exclusive game for videogame console Zeebo Turma da Mônica - Vamos Brincar Nº1, but the game was canceled months later. The idea was to create a series of eight puzzle games, but due to the end of the island the project was canceled.

In 2012, "Quero Ser da Turma da Mônica", a game where the user can create a digital avatar in the style of the characters, was released for iOS. In 2013 a game was released for iOS and Android called "Coelhadas da Mônica" (Bunny-Bashing Monica), a puzzle game like Angry Birds. And in 2014, the game "Jogo do Cascão" (The Smudge Game) was released as a 2D platform running game with multiple stages.

Mônica Park 
An amusement park themed with Mauricio de Souza's characters is located at the Eldorado Shopping in São Paulo. It was opened in January 1993, and features a number of attractions, like the "Carrossel do Horácio" (Horacio's merry-go-round, a carousel featuring dinosaurs instead of horses), the 3-D cinema, and many more. The Parque da Mônica of Curitiba and of Rio de Janeiro were also created, in 1998 and 2001, respectively, but both were closed, in 2000 and 2005, respectively. Until the end of 2006, it had its own comic book, featuring adventures of Monica and her friends at the park. When Panini Comics started to publish Mauricio's works, this comic was replaced by Turma da Mônica (Monica and Friends).

The park was removed from Eldorado Shopping Center on early 2010, when the space occupied by it was asked back by the shopping administrators. Mauricio de Sousa had already announced that the mall had requested the area back in July 2009. The administration of the Shopping said that the mall was seeking more up-to-date alternatives, which fall under consumers' expectations.

In March 2015, it was announced that the park would be reopened at Shopping SP Market .

Merchandising 
In the late 60s a line of dolls with characters Monica, Jimmy Five, Thunder, Horacio and Lucinda was manufactured by Trol Company, this was the first merchandising of the franchise. The character Thunder became mascot of a tomato sauce brand of the food company Cica in the late of 60s. An extensive line of toys and other products with the characters began to be manufactured since the 70s by various toy companies and remain heavily sold to the present in Brazilian stores.
During the 80s, the franchise also came to have its own store network. The Lojinha da Mônica and Trenzinho da Mônica, had branches in several states of Brazil, selling products related to characters. In 2013, the franchise was restarted in the form of an e-commerce portal.

International distribution 
Monica and Friends and related works have been published in 40 countries in 14 languages, including Spanish, Greek and Japanese.

In Germany, comics were published between 1975 and 1980 under the name Fratz und Freunde and years later as Monica und Ihre Freunde. In the UK, comics have already been published under the name Frizz and Friends for a short time. In Italy, some comic books and classic episodes of cartoon were distributed on DVDs in the 90s, the cartoon was broadcast on Rai Due channel under the title La Banda di Monica. In Indonesia, the series is published under the title Monika dan kawan kawan, the comics are published there since 1997, along the comic books of the characters Jimmi Lima (Jimmy Five) and Ciko Bento (Chuck Billy N' Folks). In China the comics were distributed to schools in 2007, receiving years later adaptation of the cartoon, in 2011 one of the albums was awarded to children's literature.

There were plans for distribution in the United States and some Latin American countries, but they never came to fruition (with the exception of the proper cartoon broadcast dubbed into Spanish in some Latin American countries), however translated comics in English and Spanish are sold directly in Brazil. Episodes of the cartoon dubbed in English  are available on YouTube.

References

External links

Manga adaptation 
  
  

 
Brazilian comic strips
Comic book digests
1959 comics debuts
Brazilian comics adapted into films
Comics about parallel universes
Fiction about size change
Metafictional comics
Brazil-exclusive video games
Humor comics
Satirical comics
Gag-a-day comics
Comics adapted into animated series
Comics adapted into television series
Comics adapted into video games